The Great Blue Hill Observation Tower, known locally as Eliot Tower, a  stone structure, was built by the Civilian Conservation Corps (CCC). Its rubble stone base is joined to that of the Eliot Memorial Bridge and the two appear now to have been built together. The tower offers a view over about 270°, including all of Boston, Boston Harbor, and much of the South Shore.
The tower is near the  summit of Great Blue Hill, a few hundred yards from and a little below the Great Blue Hill Weather Observatory, which is at the top of the mountain.  The view from the observation tower toward the Observatory and its forest of radio, TV, and microwave antennas, is obscured by trees.
The tower was added to the National Register of Historic Places in 1980.

Gallery

See also
National Register of Historic Places listings in Milton, Massachusetts

References

Milton, Massachusetts
Civilian Conservation Corps in Massachusetts
National Register of Historic Places in Milton, Massachusetts
Observation towers on the National Register of Historic Places
Towers in Massachusetts
Buildings and structures completed in 1934